Kanmaw may refer to:

 Kanmaw Kyun, also known as Kanmaw Island, an island in the Mergui Archipelago
 Kanmaw To
 wnship, a township of Myeik District in the Taninthayi Division of Burma
 Kyunsu, better known as Kanmaw, a small town on the island of Kanmaw Kyun in the Mergui Archipelago of southeastern Burma